Anna Sacconi is an Italian Professor Emeritus of Aegean civilisation at La Sapienza, University of Rome. She is known for her work on the corpus of Linear B vase inscriptions and Linear B tablets from Thebes.

Career 

Sacconi studied classical philology at La Sapienza, she was first assistant professor of Greek literature and lecturer in Mycenaean philology before becoming professor of Aegean Civilisation in 1975. From 1974 until 1987 she was the director of Istituto per gli Studi Micenei ed Egeo-Anatolici (Institute for Mycenean and Aegean-Anatolian studies) at the Consiglio Nazionale delle Ricerche, where she was also editor of the series Incunabula Graeca and the journal Studi Micenei ed Egeo-Anatolici. She was coordinator of Mycenaean philology within the department of Greek and Latin Philology from 1988 until 2010. Since 1981 she is the representative for Italy in the Comité International Permanent des Etudes Mycéniennes which is affiliated with the Unesco. She is Editor in Chief together with Louis Godart of Pasiphae. Rivista di filologia e di antichità egee.

Sacconi's work includes editions of Linear B texts, including editions of the Linear B vase inscriptions in 1974 and a supplement in 2017. She also published the Linear B tablets from Thebes, along with Vassilis Aravantinos and Louis Godart. She has produced exegetical studies too, regarding religion, myths and society in comparison with the Near Ancient East. Sacconi is a prolific author and has produced more than 150 scientific works, exceeding her technical topic to a wider perspective on the Mycenaean culture.

Selected publications 

 with Louis Godart. (2017) Supplemento al Corpus delle iscrizioni vascolari in lineare B. 
 ed. with Ernesto De Miro, Louis Godart. (1996). Atti e memorie del secondo Congresso internazionale di micenologia: Roma-Napoli, 14-20 ottobre 1991. Roma: Gruppo editoriale internazionale. .
 with Vassilis L. Aravantinos, Eleni Andrikou, Louis Godart, Joanita Vroom. (2006). Thèbes. Fouilles de la Cadmèe. II.2: Les tablettes en linéaire B de la Odos Pelopidou. Le contexte archéologique, La céramique de la Odos Pelopidou et la chronologie du linéaire B. 
 with Vassilis L. Aravantinos, Louis Godart. (2002) Thèbes. Fouilles de la Cadmèe. III: Corpus des documents d’archives en linéaire B de Thèbes (1–433). 
 with Aravantinos, V., Godart, L. (2001). Thèbes: Fouilles de la Cadmée. I, Les tablettes en linéaire B de la Odos Pelopidou: édition et commentaire. 
 ed. (1988). Michael Ventris. Work notes on Minoan language research and other unedited papers. Roma: Edizioni dell'Ateneo.
 with Louis Godart. (1978). Les tablettes en linéaire B de Thèbes. Roma: Edizioni dell'Ateneo & Bizzarri. 
 (1974). Corpus delle iscrizioni vascolari in lineare B. Roma: Edizioni dell'Ateneo.

References

External links 

Anna Sacconi curriculum vitae. 

Living people
1938 births
Italian classical scholars
Women classical scholars
Scholars of Mycenaean Greek
Archaeologists of the Bronze Age Aegean
Academic staff of the Sapienza University of Rome
Sapienza University of Rome alumni
Italian women academics